Guy Aghaj may refer to:
 Guy Aghaj, East Azerbaijan
 Guy Aghaj, West Azerbaijan